Gearhead(s) may refer to:
 Slang for an automobile enthusiast, usually with mechanical abilities
 Slang for a technology enthusiast, usually one who is tech savvy.
 Geared head, a type of photography tripod head used in cinematography to ensure very smooth pans and tilts
 Gearhead (DC Comics), a comic book supervillain
 Gearhead Records, a record label
 Gearhead Garage, a 1999 video game
 Gearheads (video game), a 1996 video game
 Transmission (mechanics), a mechanical gearing device that reduces or increases gearing that is connected to a motor